Labdia amphipterna is a moth in the family Cosmopterigidae. It is found in India (Coorg).

References

External links
Natural History Museum Lepidoptera generic names catalog

Labdia
Moths described in 1917